Yantoni Edy Saputra (born 30 April 1997) is an Indonesian badminton player affiliated with Djarum club. He alongside Indonesia team won the silver medals at the 2013 and 2015 World Junior Championships.

Achievements

BWF International Challenge/Series (3 titles, 2 runners-up) 
Men's doubles

Mixed doubles

  BWF International Challenge tournament
  BWF International Series tournament

Performance timeline

Indonesian team 
 Junior level

Individual competitions 
 Junior level

 Senior level

References

External links 
 

1997 births
Living people
People from Samarinda
Sportspeople from East Kalimantan
Indonesian male badminton players
21st-century Indonesian people